Markus Pavić (born 26 March 1995) is an Austrian footballer who plays as a left back.

Career
On 4 September 2020, he joined Italian Serie B club Virtus Entella.

Personal life
Born in Austria, Pavic is of Croatian descent.

Career statistics

Club

References

External links
 

1995 births
Living people
Footballers from Vienna
Austrian people of Croatian descent
Austrian footballers
Association football defenders
Austrian Football Bundesliga players
Austrian Regionalliga players
FC Admira Wacker Mödling players
Croatian Football League players
NK Rudeš players
NK Istra 1961 players
FC Sochaux-Montbéliard players
Serie B players
Serie C players
Virtus Entella players
Austrian expatriate footballers
Expatriate footballers in France
Expatriate footballers in Croatia
Expatriate footballers in Italy
Austrian expatriate sportspeople in France
Austrian expatriate sportspeople in Croatia
Austrian expatriate sportspeople in Italy